Gurdev Singh Khush (born August 22, 1935) is an Agronomist and Geneticist who, along with mentor Henry Beachell, received the 1996 World Food Prize for his achievements in enlarging and improving the global supply of rice during a time of exponential population growth.

Education 
He graduated with a B.Sc. from Punjab Agricultural University in 1955 and Ph.D. from the University of California, Davis (UC Davis) in 1960.

Career 
After serving as a faculty member of the University of California (UC) for seven years studying the tomato genome, he joined the International Rice Research Institute (IRRI) in the Philippines as Plant Breeder. He was appointed a Head of the Plant Breeding Department in 1972 where, in pursuit of ever-improved rice varieties to nourish the growing developing world and support its agricultural economies, he spent over twenty years directing and participating in genetic research and breeding. During that time he played a key role in the development of more than 300 innovative rice strains such as Semi-dwarf IR36. World rice production increased from 257 million tons in 1966 to 626 million tons in 2006.
 
He retired from IRRI in February 2002 as Principal Plant Breeder and Head of Division of Plant Breeding Genetics and Biochemistry and returned to UC Davis as adjunct professor. He also served on the Life Sciences jury for the Infosys Prize in 2010.

Honours and awards
Khush has earned many awards, including the Borlaug Award (1977), the Japan Prize (1987), the World Food Prize (1996), Padma Shri (2000) and the Wolf Prize in Agriculture (2000). He was elected a Fellow of the Royal Society in 1995 and by the National Academy of Agricultural Sciences as their foreign fellow in 1991.

Notable publications

References

Indian agronomists
1935 births
Living people
Fellows of the Indian National Science Academy
Foreign associates of the National Academy of Sciences
Fellows of the Royal Society
Foreign members of the Chinese Academy of Sciences
Foreign Members of the Russian Academy of Sciences
Wolf Prize in Agriculture laureates
British geneticists
Recipients of the Padma Shri in science & engineering
Fellows of the National Academy of Agricultural Sciences
University of California, Davis alumni